Alvin Arrondel (born 11 November 1993) is a French professional footballer who plays as a defender.

Club career
Arrondel signed for the PSG academy in the 2008/09 season.

In July 2013, Alvin has signed his first professional contract with PSG for one year.

In 2014, his contract expired and he was linked with a move to Creteil.

On 1 August 2014, Arrondel signed for Vitória Guimarães of Portugal with his two agents Jeremie Fhima and Guido Boccara, penning a three-year contract.

During the 2016 summer window, he joined Portimonense for a one year loan.

References

External links
 
 
 
 

1993 births
Footballers from Val-d'Oise
Living people
Association football defenders
French footballers
Vitória S.C. B players
French expatriate footballers
Expatriate footballers in Portugal
Liga Portugal 2 players
Vitória S.C. players
Primeira Liga players
Portimonense S.C. players
France youth international footballers